In Concert: Merchants of Cool is a live album and DVD by English hard rock band Bad Company. It was recorded principally at The Paramount Theater, Denver, Colorado and The Grove of Anaheim, Anaheim, California, in January 2002. It features hits from both Bad Company and precursor band Free as well as two new studio tracks, "Joe Fabulous" and "Saving Grace". It is their only album not to feature guitarist Mick Ralphs; longtime session guitarist Dave “Bucket” Colwell, who had previously appeared on the Here Comes Trouble album, plays in Mick’s place. Additionally, Jaz Lochrie plays bass instead of Boz Burrell. The band covers two songs from the Beatles, "Ticket to Ride" and "I Feel Fine", as well as one from Paul Rodgers' and Simon Kirke's former band Free, "All Right Now".

Track listing
 "Burnin' Sky" (Paul Rodgers) – 5:35
 "Can't Get Enough" (Mick Ralphs) – 3:47
 "Feel Like Makin' Love" (Ralphs, Rodgers) – 5:26
 "Rock Steady" (Rodgers) – 3:49
 "Movin' On" (Ralphs) – 3:10
 "Deal with the Preacher" (Ralphs, Rodgers) – 4:34
 "Ready for Love" (Ralphs) – 6:33
 "Rock 'n' Roll Fantasy / Ticket to Ride / I Feel Fine" (Rodgers,  John Lennon, Paul McCartney) – 6:29
 "All Right Now" (Andy Fraser, Rodgers) – 6:28
 "Bad Company" (Simon Kirke, Rodgers) – 5:42
 "Silver, Blue and Gold" (Rodgers) – 5:02
 "Shooting Star" (Rodgers) – 6:42
 "Joe Fabulous" (Rodgers) – 3:39 (new studio track)
 "Saving Grace" (Rodgers, Neal Schon, Geoff Whitehorn) – 4:07 (new studio recording of a Paul Rodgers solo song from Now)

Personnel
Paul Rodgers – vocals, arranger, guitar, piano
Dave Colwell – guitar, background vocals
Jaz Lochrie – bass, background vocals
Simon Kirke – drums, percussion, background vocals
Recorded by Chris Mickle, Bud Martin & Justin Peacock.

Video formats
 1.78:1 Anamorphic widescreen

Audio formats
 Dolby Digital 5.1 Surround (English)
 Dolby Digital 2.0 Stereo (English)
 Running Time: 140 Minutes
 Release Year: 2002
 MPAA Rating: Not Rated

Charts
Album  – Billboard (United States)

Singles – Billboard (United States)

References

Bad Company albums
2002 live albums
Sanctuary Records live albums
Live video albums
2002 video albums
Sanctuary Records video albums